Sead Mehić (born 8 April 1975) is a Bosnian-Herzegovinian former footballer.

Club career
On 17 May 2010, Mehić left FSV Frankfurt of the 2. Fußball-Bundesliga and signed with 3. Liga club Kickers Offenbach.

References

External links
 German career stats – FuPa

1975 births
Living people
People from Bijeljina
Association football forwards
Bosnia and Herzegovina footballers
Eintracht Frankfurt players
Eintracht Frankfurt II players
SV Meppen players
SV Wehen Wiesbaden players
Rot-Weiß Oberhausen players
FSV Frankfurt players
Kickers Offenbach players
2. Bundesliga players
Regionalliga players
Oberliga (football) players
3. Liga players
Bosnia and Herzegovina expatriate footballers
Expatriate footballers in Germany
Bosnia and Herzegovina expatriate sportspeople in Germany